Leonard "Len" Constance (2 November 1922 – October 1990) was a Welsh rugby union, and professional rugby league footballer who played in the 1940s and 1950s, and coached rugby league in the 1950s.

Background
Len Constance's birth was registered in Pontypool district, Wales, he was a Lieutenant in the Royal Naval Volunteer Reserve, and he died aged  in Wales.

Playing career

International honours
Len Constance won 3 caps for Wales (RL) in 1948–1951 while at St. Helens, and Dewsbury.

County League appearances
Len Constance played in Wigan's victory in the Lancashire County League during the 1951–52 season.

Notable tour matches
Len Constance played , and scored a goal in Wigan's 8–15 defeat by New Zealand at Central Park, Wigan on Saturday 3 November 1951.

Club career
On Thursday 20 January 1949, Leonard Constance was sold by St. Helens to Dewsbury for £2000 (based on increases in average earnings, this would be approximately £162,900 in 2013) along with Harry Street who was sold for £1000, the £3000 raised, contributed to the £4000 St. Helens paid Belle Vue Rangers for Stan McCormick, Constance made his début for Wakefield Trinity during September 1952.

Coaching career

Club career
Len Constance was the coach of Dewsbury from Tuesday 10 July 1951, until 21-days later when he placed himself on the transfer list  on Tuesday 31 July 1951, shortly after this he joined Wigan (as did fellow Dewsbury player; Harry Street) on-or-before Saturday 18 August 1951.

Outside of rugby
Leonard Constance taught at Rivington Road School in St. Helens, where another Welsh St. Helens player, Don Gullick also taught

Genealogical information
Leonard Constance's marriage to Elsie B. (née Nixon) (birth registered second ¼ 1927 in Prescot district) was registered during fourth ¼ 1948 in St. Helens district, they had children; Susan H. Constance (birth registered third ¼  in St. Helens district), Gillian K. R. Constance (birth registered first ¼  in St.Helens district), and Michael S. Constance (birth registered second ¼  in Pontypool district).

References

External links
Statistics at blackandambers.co.uk
Profile at saints.org.uk
Search for "Len Constance" at britishnewspaperarchive.co.uk

1922 births
1990 deaths
Bristol Bears players
Combined Services rugby union players
Dewsbury Rams captains
Dewsbury Rams coaches
Dewsbury Rams players
Footballers who switched code
Newport RFC players
Place of death missing
Royal Naval Volunteer Reserve personnel
Royal Navy officers
Royal Navy rugby union players
Rugby league centres
Rugby league five-eighths
Rugby league players from Pontypool
Rugby union fly-halves
Rugby union players from Pontypool
St Helens R.F.C. players
Wakefield Trinity players
Wales national rugby league team players
Welsh rugby league coaches
Welsh rugby league players
Welsh rugby union players
Welsh schoolteachers
Wigan Warriors players